UTRome is a database of three-prime untranslated regions  in C. elegans

See also
 untranslated region (UTR)
 UTRdb

References

External links
 http://www.UTRome.org

Biological databases
RNA
Gene expression